Kafatos  is a Greek surname. Notable people with the surname include:

 Dimitrios Kafatos (born 1976), Greek handball player 
 Fotis Kafatos (1940-2017), Greek biologist
 Menas Kafatos (born 1945), American physicist

Greek-language surnames
Surnames